Toppe is a surname. Notable people with the surname include:

Kjersti Toppe (born 1967), Norwegian politician
Steffen Ingebriktsen Toppe (1902–1979), Norwegian politician
Torgeir Toppe, Norwegian sprint canoer

See also
Topper (surname)